The Men's 1974 World Amateur Boxing Championships were held in Havana, Cuba from August 17 to 30. The first edition of this competition, held two years before the Summer Olympics in Montreal, Quebec, Canada, was organised by the world governing body for amateur boxing AIBA. A total number of 274 boxers from 45 countries entered.

Medal table

Medal winners

External links 
Results on Amateur Boxing

World Amateur Boxing Championships
AIBA World Boxing Championships
Sport in Havana
B
Boxing Championships
20th century in Havana
Sports competitions in Havana